Explorer Dream is a Leo class cruise ship that most recently operated with Dream Cruises. She was built in 1999 by the Meyer Werft shipyard in Papenburg, Germany as SuperStar Virgo. She is expected to enter service with Resorts World Cruises as Resorts World One in February 2023.

Concept and construction
SuperStar Virgo was ordered by Star Cruises on 22 November 1995 as Hull 647 from the Meyer Werft shipyard in Papenburg, Germany as the second ship of the Leo class, and the second new build for Star Cruises. She was designed specifically for the Asian cruise market. The keel of the SuperStar Virgo was laid on 18 November 1996, and she was floated out of dry dock on 23 December 1998. She was delivered to Star Cruises on 2 August 1999.

Service history

SuperStar Virgo
Following the transit from Papenburg to Singapore the SuperStar Virgo entered service on cruises from Singapore on 10 October 1999. On 24 April 2003 the SuperStar Virgo was relocated from Singapore to operate cruises out of Perth, Western Australia due to the outbreak of the severe acute respiratory syndrome (SARS) in Southeast Asia. Initially the redeployment was planned to last only a one-month evaluation period, but SuperStar Virgo continued to be based in Perth until July 2003.

On 2 April 2008 the SuperStar Virgo relocated from Singapore to Hong Kong as her port of departure until 26 October 2008, the redeployment coinciding with the 2008 Summer Olympics in Beijing. She returned to Singapore in October 2008.

In January 2009, Star Cruises installed a 100m waterslide on the  SuperStar Virgo during her dry dock period in Singapore, and in January 2012, received new hull art and livery.

Between April and October 2014 she was based in Hong Kong.

From 13 November 2015 to 31 December 2015, SuperStar Virgo undertook a 48-day cruise to the Southern Hemisphere with over 20 ports of call.

From 3 January 2016 to 11 November 2016, SuperStar Virgo was homeported in Nansha, Guangzhou and Hong Kong.

From November 2016 to December 2016, she continued to be based at Hong Kong.

From January 2017 to March 2017, she was based in Shenzhen and cruised to Vietnamese ports and Hong Kong.

Explorer Dream
SuperStar Virgo was transferred to Dream Cruises and following a US$65 million refit at Sembawang Shipyard in Singapore, was renamed Explorer Dream. She will operate from Australia during the 2019-20 cruise season. The ship was supposed to return to north Asia and based in Shanghai for the summer of 2020, but due to the COVID-19 pandemic, her deployment in China was cancelled and was subsequently laid up in Port Klang, Malaysia and sailed to various ports around Asia to load and offload crew members. In July she arrived in Keelung, Taiwan and awaited her island hopping cruises which began on 26Jul. Her island hopping cruises in Taiwan made several stops in islands of Taiwan like Penghu and Matsu, and only made a technical call in Japan without disembarkation.

Resorts World One
Following the collapse of Genting Hong Kong, Explorer Dream has been laid up off the coast of Port Klang. It was announced on 13 January 2023, that the ship will be renamed to Resorts World One and will join Resorts World Cruises. Expected to enter service on 17 February, briefly taken over cruises for Genting Dream which will head to dry dock. On 1 March 2023, the ship will reposition to Hong Kong where it will sail 2-3 night cruises.

Media
In the 2013, Japanese movie Nazotoki wa Dinner no Ato de take place on SuperStar Virgo.

Gallery

References

External links

 Star Cruises official website for SuperStar Virgo

Ships of Star Cruises
Ships built in Papenburg
1998 ships
Ships of the Dream Cruises